The Ryukyu Archipelago (Japanese: 琉球列島, Ryūkyū-rettō) are a collection of 100+ islands located between Kyushu and Taiwan. They are politically split between the Japanese prefectures of Okinawa and Kagoshima.

Kagoshima Prefecture 
The northernmost parts of the Ryukyu Islands are within Kagoshima Prefecture. These islands are referred to as the Satsunan Islands (薩南諸島, Satsunan-shotō), meaning “south of Satsuma”, as they were the southernmost territories of the Satsuma Domain.

Ōsumi Islands 
 Yakushima
 Tanegashima
 Kuchinoerabu-jima
 Mageshima
 Kuroshima (Kagoshima)
 Iōjima (Kagoshima)
 Takeshima (Kagoshima)
 Shōwa Iōjima
 Denshima

Tokara Islands 

 Hirase
 Kuchinoshima
 Nakanoshima (Kagoshima)
 Gajajima
 Kogajajima
 Tairajima
 Suwanosejima
 Akusekijima
 Kojima
 Kodakarajima
 Takarajima
 Kaminonejima
 Yokoate-jima

Amami Islands 

 Amami Ōshima
 Kikaijima
 Kakeromajima
 Yoroshima
 Uke Island
 Tokunoshima
 Okinoerabujima
 Yoronjima
 Edateku Island
 Sukomobanare Island
 Yubanare Island
 Kiyama Island

Okinawa Prefecture 
Islands south of the Satsunan Islands are administered by Okinawa Prefecture. Its predecessor was the Ryukyu Kingdom, an independent nation until 1879.

Japan has de facto control over the disputed Senkaku Islands, claiming them as part of Ishigaki City in Okinawa Prefecture. However, they are not geographically within the Ryukyu Archipelago, being located further westward in the East China Sea.

Okinawa Islands 

 Okinawa Island
 Iheya Island
 Izena Island
 Iejima
 Sesoko Island
 Yokatsu Islands
 Ikei Island
 Hamahiga Island
 Henza Island
 Minamiukibara Island
 Miyagi Island
 Tsuken Island
 Ukibara Island
 Yabuchi Island
 Kume Island
 Kerama Islands
 Tokashiki Island
 Zamami Island
 Aka Island
 Geruma Island
 Aguni Islands
 Aguni Island
 Tonaki Island
 Irisuna-jima

Miyako Islands 

 Miyako-jima
 Ikema Island
 Irabu Island
 Kurima-jima
 Ogami Island
 Shimoji-shima
 Minna Island (Tarama, Okinawa)
 Tarama Island

Yaeyama Islands 

 Ishigaki Island
 Aragusuku Island
 Hateruma
 Iriomote Island
 Kayama Island
 Kohama Island
 Kuroshima (Okinawa)
 Sotobanari
 Taketomi Island
 Yubu Island
 Hatoma
 Yonaguni

Daitō Islands 

 Minamidaitōjima
 Kitadaitōjima
 Okidaitōjima

See also 

 Ryukyu Islands

References 

Ryukyu Islands
Archipelagoes
Islands of Japan
Ryukyu Archipelago
Islands